Ken Hirschkop teaches in the English Department at the University of Waterloo, Ontario, Canada.

Biography
Hirschkop grew up in Boston, Massachusetts, and attended local schools before heading to do his first degree at Swarthmore. His original academic speciality was music theory and history. He then became an apprentice making harpsichords. In 1981 he moved to the UK to take up a place at the University of London to do an MA. His interest in Bakhtin then took him to Oxford where he began to do his doctoral research on the work of Mikhail Bakhtin, focusing on his theory of language under the supervision of Terry Eagleton. His book Mikhail Bakhtin: An Aesthetic for Democracy was largely based on his Phd thesis and was published by Oxford University Press in 1999. During his Oxford years, Hirschkop was deeply involved in the activities of Oxford English Limited and its journal News from Nowhere: Journal of the Oxford English Faculty Opposition.
 
He worked at the University of Southampton from 1987 until 1995 teaching cultural criticism in the English department. In 1995 he moved to the University of Manchester where he ran and taught an MA programme in Cultural Criticism until 2005. In the summer of 2005 he moved to the University of Waterloo where he is currently the Graduate Chair of English.

His main publications are Benjamin’s Arcades Project: an unguided tour (co-authored with Peter Buse, Scott McCracken and Bertrand Taithe), Culture, Class and Education (1945-1970) in The Cambridge History of Twentieth-Century English Literature, Mikhail Bakhtin: An Aesthetic for Democracy in Oxford University Press of 1999, Bakhtin and Cultural Theory, co-edited with David Shepherd and 'Linguistic Turns: Writing on Language & Social Theory', April 2019, Oxford University Press

External links
Ken Hirschkop: homepage at University of Waterloo.
 Ken Hirschkop: On Being Difficult, Electronic Book Review, 2007.

Living people
Academic staff of the University of Waterloo
Year of birth missing (living people)
Academics of the University of Southampton
Academics of the University of Manchester
American expatriate academics